Jonathan Bryce Love (born July 8, 1997) is an American football running back who is currently a free agent. He played college football at Stanford and was drafted by the Washington Redskins in the fourth round of the 2019 NFL Draft, although he never played in a game with them due to a lingering issue from a knee injury he suffered at Stanford. In his youth, he was also a sprinter specializing in the 200 meters and 400 meters, earning USA Track & Field Youth Athlete of the Year honors in 2009.

High school career
A native of Wake Forest, North Carolina, Love attended Wake Forest-Rolesville High School. In addition to track, he competed in football and drew comparisons to Keith Marshall. At the combine of the 2013 U.S. Army All-American Bowl in San Antonio, Texas, Love ran an electronically timed 4.4 seconds in the 40-yard dash.

A track athlete from an early age, Love attended the 2009 USATF National Junior Olympic Track & Field Championships, setting national record times of 11.64 in the 100m, 23.37 in the 200m and 50.75 in the 400m dash. It was the first time a boy from the midget age group (11–12 years old) has set three national records in one year. Love was named USA Track & Field Youth Athlete of the Year 2009. Soon after, Love set new records in the 13–14 yrs group at a meet in Hoschton, Georgia. He ran 10.73 in the 100 and 21.83 in the 200 on consecutive days. As a football player, he was rated as a 4-star recruit, committing to Stanford over offers from Clemson, East Carolina, Florida, Georgia, North Carolina, South Carolina, Tennessee, Virginia Tech, and Wisconsin, among others.

College career

Regarded as a four-star recruit by ESPN, Love was ranked as the No. 18 running back prospect of the class of 2015.

In the 2015 and 2016 seasons, Love backed up Christian McCaffrey, a first-round selection in the 2017 NFL Draft. Love accumulated 1,009 rushing yards in these two seasons.

2017 season
Love had a break-out season in 2017 with 2,118 rushing yards. Love was second in the nation in rushing yards and in rushing yards per game. Love reached the 1,000-yard rushing mark in just the fifth game of the season. He had back-to-back games with over 250 rushing yards, making him only the second Pac-12 player to accomplish this (along with Reggie Bush). He ran for a school-record 301 yards in a game. Love ran for at least 100 yards in twelve of his thirteen games, leading all running backs in the nation.

Love won the Doak Walker Award as the nation's best running back. He won the Lombardi Award for 2017. He was a unanimous first-team All American. The Pac-12 named Love its Offensive Player of the Year. Love also was named to the All-Pac-12 First-team.  Like McCaffrey in 2015, Love was the runner-up for the 2017 Heisman Trophy.

2018 season
In his senior season, Love was one of the team captains. He was put on several preseason All-American lists as well as preseason award watch lists. He missed some time due to injury, but managed to finish the year with 739 rushing yards and six rushing touchdowns. At the end of the season, he earned Pac-12 honorable mention. Love graduated from Stanford with a degree in human biology in 2019.

Statistics

Professional career

Prior to the draft, Love suffered a torn anterior cruciate ligament in his final college game which led to a concern among teams. He ultimately was drafted by the Washington Redskins in the fourth round, 112th overall, of the 2019 NFL Draft. He signed his rookie contract with the team on May 9, 2019. He was placed on the non-football injury list before the start of the season on August 31, 2019. He was active for a few games in 2020 before being placed on injured reserve on October 2. He was designated to return from injured reserve (IR) in November and practiced with the team, but was not elevated to the active roster in time and remained on IR. Love was eventually waived by the team on April 19, 2021, having never played in a game with them.

References

External links
 
 
 Stanford Cardinal bio

1997 births
Living people
All-American college football players
American football running backs
American male sprinters
People from Wake Forest, North Carolina
Players of American football from North Carolina
Stanford Cardinal football players
Track and field athletes from North Carolina
Washington Redskins players
Washington Football Team players